Marco Formentini (born 3 July 1970 in Lavagna, Genova) is a male freestyle swimmer from Italy. He also competes in the open water swimming, winning a silver and a bronze medal at the World Aquatics Championships.

Formentini competed for his native country at the 1996 Summer Olympics in Atlanta, Georgia, finishing in 18th place in the men's 1500 m freestyle event. He was affiliated with Gruppo Sportivo Carabinieri and Rari Nantes Savona in the 1990s.

References
sports-reference

1970 births
Living people
People from Lavagna
Italian male swimmers
Italian male long-distance swimmers
Olympic swimmers of Italy
Swimmers at the 1996 Summer Olympics
World Aquatics Championships medalists in open water swimming
Universiade medalists in swimming
Universiade silver medalists for Italy
Universiade bronze medalists for Italy
Swimmers of Centro Sportivo Carabinieri
Medalists at the 1997 Summer Universiade
Sportspeople from the Province of Genoa
20th-century Italian people